Sericus brunneus is a species of click beetles native to Europe.

References

Elateridae
Beetles described in 1758
Taxa named by Carl Linnaeus
Beetles of Europe